Liolaemus crandalli is a species of lizard in the family  Liolaemidae. It is native to Argentina.

References

crandalli
Reptiles described in 2015
Reptiles of Argentina
Taxa named by Luciano Javier Ávila
Taxa named by Jack W. Sites Jr.